Tenellia antarctica is a species of sea slug, an aeolid nudibranch, a marine gastropod mollusc in the family Fionidae.

Distribution
This species was described from Antarctica.

References 

Fionidae
Gastropods described in 1886
Fauna of Antarctica